Thomas James Smith was an Anglican priest in the last decade of the nineteenth century and the opening decades of the twentieth.

Smith was ordained deacon in 1899, and priest in 1901. After curacies in Blenheim and Greytown he held incumbencies at Picton, Amuri, Wakefield and Nelson. He was Archdeacon of Waimea from 1932 until 1940; and Archdeacon of Māwhera from 1940 to 1955.

References

20th-century Anglican priests
Archdeacons of Māwhera
Archdeacons of Waimea
Year of birth missing
Year of death missing